James (Jim) Champy (born 1942) is an Italian American business consultant, and organizational theorist, known for his work in the field of business process reengineering, business process improvement and organizational change.

Life and work 
Champy earned his B.S. in 1963 and his M.S. in civil engineering in 1965 from Massachusetts Institute of Technology, and a J.D. degree from Boston College Law School in 1968.

Champy was chairman and chief executive officer of CSC Index, the management consulting arm of Computer Sciences Corporation. He had been one of the original founders of Index, a $200 million consulting practice that was acquired by CSC in 1988. Subsequently he was chairman of Dell Perot Systems’ (now Dell Services) consulting practice, where he was responsible for providing direction and guidance to the company’s team of business and management consultants.

Nowadays Champy consults with senior-level executives of multinational companies seeking to improve business performance. His approach centers on helping leaders achieve business results through four distinct, yet overlapping areas: business strategy, management and operations, organizational development and change, and information technology.

He was a senior research fellow at Harvard's Advanced Leadership Initiative from 2011-2015. He is a life member of the MIT Corporation, Massachusetts Institute of Technology's board of trustees, and serves on the board of overseers of the Boston College Law School. He is also a member of the board of directors of Analog Devices, Inc.

Champy is a member of the MIT School of Engineering Dean's Advisory Council (DAC).

Selected publications 
 Michael Hammer, and James Champy. Reengineering the Corporation: Manifesto for Business Revolution, A. Zondervan, 1993; 2009.
 Champy, James, and Lawrence Cohen. Reengineering management. Dunod, 1995.
 Champy, James. X-engineering the corporation. New York, NY: Warner Books, 2002.

Articles, a selection
 Champy, James A. "Preparing for organizational change." The organization of the future (1997): 9-16.

References

External links

 James A. Champy, Business Week, profile

1942 births
Living people
American chief executives
American business theorists
MIT School of Engineering alumni